Chestnut Hill is a wealthy New England village located  west of downtown Boston, Massachusetts, United States. Like all Massachusetts villages, Chestnut Hill is not an incorporated municipal entity. It is located partially in Brookline in Norfolk County; partially in the city of Boston in Suffolk County, and partially in the city of Newton in Middlesex County. Chestnut Hill's borders are defined by the 02467 ZIP Code. The name refers to several small hills that overlook the 135-acre (546,000 m2) Chestnut Hill Reservoir rather than one particular hill. Chestnut Hill is best known as the home of Boston College and as part of the Boston Marathon route.

History
The boundary between Newton and Brighton was originally more or less straight northwest–southeast, following today's boundary at the east edge of the Newton Commonwealth Golf Course, and the west boundary of the MBTA rail yards.  It followed what is today St. Thomas More Road and Chestnut Hill Driveway through swamp land that is today the west edge of the Chestnut Hill Reservoir, and then rejoined today's city limit that runs essentially with the portion of Beacon St. that forms the west boundary of the Reservoir, and continues southeast to today's triple point between Boston, Brookline, and Newton near the intersection of Reservoir Road and Middlesex Road, Brookline.  Around the 1870s, the Lawrence farm land that is today bounded by Commonwealth Avenue, the slope dividing Boston College upper campus from lower campus, Beacon St., Chestnut Hill Driveway, and St. Thomas More Rd. was ceded from Newton to Boston, so that Boston could construct the Chestnut Hill Reservoir.  What is today the Boston College lower campus and stadium was excavated to become the Lawrence Basin of the Reservoir, paired with the surviving Bradlee Basin, to receive water from the Sudbury Aqueduct.  Beacon St. was rerouted around the south and west edges of the Bradlee Basin.  The two halves of the Reservoir were separated to preserve the Cochituate Aqueduct, which ran under a causeway separating the two halves of the reservoir, now roughly St. Thomas More Rd. and Chestnut Hill Driveway, and a short stretch of Beacon St.

While most of Chestnut Hill remained farmland well into the early 20th century, the area around the reservoir was developed in 1870 by landscape architect Frederick Law Olmsted, designer of Central Park in New York City and of the Emerald Necklace in Boston and Brookline.

Because of the significance of its landscape and architecture, the National Register of Historic Places designated parts of Chestnut Hill as historic districts in 1986. Examples of Colonial, Italianate, Shingle, Tudor Revival, and Victorian architectural styles are evident in the village's country estates and mansions. The Boston College campus is itself an early example of Collegiate Gothic architecture.

Parkland
Hammond Pond Reservation, an extensive forest preserve and protected wetlands, goes through Chestnut Hill and Newton where it is also known as Webster Woods.

The Kennard Park and Conservation Area is a post-agricultural forest grown up on 19th century farmland. The mixed and conifer woodlands reveal colonial stone walls, a red maple swamp with century-old trees, and a sensitive fern marsh.

The Chestnut Hill Reservation embraces 120 acres, partly in Boston, partly in Newton.  The Reservation was designed by Frederick Law Olmsted’s son and constructed in the late 1860s to give Boston clean drinking water and a rural park.  Just outside the park proper, the Boston Waterworks with its three gatehouses at water’s edge and three majestic pump houses on Beacon Street is considered a masterpiece of 19th century engineering and landscape design.

The Heartbreak Hill Park, surrounding the Waban Hill reservoir, opened in 2015, and a major renovation was completed in 2020.

Shopping centers
 The Shops at Chestnut Hill
 The Street at Chestnut Hill

Transportation
Chestnut Hill is served by three branches of the Green Line of the MBTA, Boston's light rail system. Stations include:
B branch: Chestnut Hill Avenue, South Street, Boston College
C branch: Cleveland Circle
D branch: Reservoir, Chestnut Hill
The area is also served by various MBTA buses, e.g. Routes 51, 60 and 86.

Registered historic districts
 Boston College Main Campus Historic District – 140 Commonwealth Ave. (in Newton)
 Chestnut Hill Historic District – roughly bounded by Middlesex Rd., Reservoir Ln., Denny Rd., Boylston St. and Dunster Rd. (added November 17, 1985) (mostly in Brookline, but includes a few properties that spill into Newton)
 Chestnut Hill Reservoir Historic District – within Boston city limits
 Old Chestnut Hill Historic District – along Hammond St. and Chestnut Hill Rd. roughly bounded by Beacon St. and Essex Rd., and Suffolk Rd. (added October 4, 1986), within Newton city limits

Business

Chestnut Hill Realty

Education
The village is served by the Brookline Public Schools, Newton Public Schools, and Boston Public Schools, depending on the city or town in which a particular residence is located. The neighborhood also features several private schools including Mount Alvernia Academy (Roman Catholic, K–6), Brimmer and May School (non-denominational, K–12), and The Chestnut Hill School. 

Chestnut Hill is home to both Boston College and Pine Manor College.

Notable people

Tom Brady, NFL quarterback  
Michael Dukakis, former governor of Massachusetts and 1988 Democratic nominee for President
Mary Baker Eddy, founder of The First Church of Christ, Scientist and The Christian Science Monitor newspaper, 1908–1910
Theo Epstein, former general manager of the Chicago Cubs, former general manager of the Boston Red Sox
Reginald Fessenden, called the father of broadcast radio, the Reginald A. Fessenden House in Chestnut Hill (Newton) is a US National Landmark as well as a US Historic Place.
Paul Fireman, purchased American distribution rights to Reebok, Chairman of Fireman Capital Partners, Inc.
Terry Francona, former manager of the Boston Red Sox, current manager of the Cleveland Indians
John W. Henry, principal owner of the Boston Red Sox and Liverpool F.C.
Jarome Iginla, former NHL player
Seth Klarman, Founder and CEO of the Baupost Group
Robert Kraft, owner of the New England Patriots
Alice Hathaway Lee Roosevelt, the first wife of Theodore Roosevelt, and mother of Alice Roosevelt Longworth
Leverett Saltonstall, Governor of Massachusetts (1939–1945) and United States Senator (1945–1967)
Thomas G. Stemberg, founder of Staples Inc.
Alan Trefler, founder and CEO of Pegasystems
John A. Wilson, sculptor

See also

 List of Registered Historic Places in Brookline, Massachusetts
 List of Registered Historic Places in Newton, Massachusetts
 List of Registered Historic Places in Suffolk County, Massachusetts

References

 
Villages in Norfolk County, Massachusetts
Brookline, Massachusetts
Villages in Middlesex County, Massachusetts
Villages in Newton, Massachusetts
Villages in Suffolk County, Massachusetts
Neighborhoods in Boston
Villages in Massachusetts